Giovanni Christiaan van Bronckhorst (born 5 February 1975) is a Dutch football manager and former player, who was most recently the manager of Scottish Premiership club Rangers. Formerly a midfielder, he moved to left-back later in his career.

During his club career, Van Bronckhorst played for RKC Waalwijk, Feyenoord, Rangers, Arsenal, Barcelona and again with Feyenoord. He was an instrumental player in Barcelona's 2005–06 UEFA Champions League victory, being in the starting line-up of the final, having played every Champions League match for Barcelona that season.

Van Bronckhorst earned 107 caps for the Netherlands national team, and played for his country in three FIFA World Cups, in 1998, 2006 and 2010, as well as three UEFA European Championships, in 2000, 2004 and 2008. After captaining the Oranje in the 2010 World Cup final, he was elected into the Order of Orange-Nassau. The 2010 World Cup final was the last match in his career.

After assisting the Dutch under-21 team and Feyenoord, Van Bronckhorst became Feyenoord manager in May 2015. He won the KNVB Cup in his first season and the club's first Eredivisie title for 18 years in 2017. In November 2021, he returned to Rangers as manager, reaching the Europa League final and winning the Scottish Cup in his first season.

Club career

Childhood and early career 
Van Bronckhorst was born in Rotterdam to Victor van Bronckhorst, an Indonesian-Dutch father, and Fransien Sapulette, an Indonesian mother of Moluccan descent. He began playing for a local amateur youth team in Rotterdam, Linker Maas Oever, from age six. He joined the youth academy at Feyenoord the following year. In 1990, aged 15, the club offered him a professional contract, which he accepted. He won the Dutch Youth League with Feyenoord in 1991, but struggled to break into the first team. He was loaned out to RKC Waalwijk, making his league debut in 1993. He returned to Feyenoord for the 1994–95 season, but was used as a fringe player, making only ten appearances for the club. 1995–96 was his breakthrough season, as he started almost every match for Feyenoord, playing alongside the likes of Regi Blinker and Henrik Larsson.

Domestically, with Feyenoord failing to break the PSV–Ajax stranglehold on the Eredivisie for the fourth-straight year, and major players such as Henrik Larsson leaving the team, Van Bronckhorst began to search for a new club. He chose to join Dick Advocaat (his former manager at international U-16 and U-18 level) at Rangers, joining the club in 1998 for a reported transfer fee between £5–5.5 million.

Rangers 
In Van Bronckhorst's first competitive game for Rangers on 22 July 1998, he scored as they came from 3–0 down to win 5–3 over League of Ireland side Shelbourne at Prenton Park in the first qualifying round of the UEFA Cup. He went on to score 22 goals for Rangers (13 in the league, three in the Scottish Cup, one in the Scottish League Cup, three in the UEFA Champions League and two in the UEFA Cup), mostly in midfield, before joining Arsenal for a fee of £8.5 million, signing a five-year contract.

One of his goals was in the 2000 Scottish Cup Final which Rangers won 4–0 against Aberdeen. Opposition goalkeeper Jim Leighton was injured in the third minute without a substitute available, and striker Robbie Winters had to take his position. He injured his groin on international duty that October, and returned on 3 March 2001 against Heart of Midlothian, playing for just 23 minutes of the 2–0 home win before being injured by Colin Cameron.

Arsenal 
Arsène Wenger had signed Van Bronckhorst in June 2001 for £8 million.
He sought to replace the midfield void from by the departure of Emmanuel Petit from Arsenal, and so partnered Patrick Vieira in the centre. However, Van Bronckhorst's start at Highbury was marked by a cruciate knee ligament injury which saw him sidelined after only a few months at the club. Despite this, Van Bronckhorst went on to win the Premier League title in 2001–02 and the FA Cup in 2002–03 with Arsenal. In all, he made 64 appearances for the Gunners, scoring twice.

Barcelona 

As the 2003–04 season approached, Van Bronckhorst had the opportunity to move to Barcelona and work with its new head coach Frank Rijkaard on a one-year loan, with a view to a permanent transfer. 
After adapting to his new role as a left-back, he helped Barça to a revival in the second half of the season. In May 2004, Van Bronckhorst completed his move from Arsenal to Barcelona for a fee of €2 million, signing a three-year deal. He won the Liga title in the 2004–05 season after some of his finest displays together with four goals to his credit. In 2005–06, he helped his club repeat as Liga champions while winning the 2005–06 UEFA Champions League as well (he was the only player who participated in all Champions League matches that season). In Spain, he used "Gio" as the name on his shirt.

Return to Feyenoord 
Van Bronckhorst had a year remaining on his Barcelona contract in 2007, but returned to Feyenoord on 27 June 2007 due to a clause in his contract stipulating he could join Feyenoord on a free transfer. Shortly after, head coach Bert van Marwijk made him captain of the club. He would go on to become a pivotal member of the squad, providing stability in an injury-hit side. At the end of his first season, he led "De Stadionclub" to win the 2007–08 KNVB Cup following a 2–0 victory in the final against Roda JC.

International career

Early years
Van Bronckhorst made his debut for the national Olympic team in 1996, although the Netherlands failed to qualify for the 1996 Olympic Games in Atlanta. He was given his first full international cap in August 1996, being given a starting place by Guus Hiddink in the [[Netherlands national football team|''Oranjes]] lineup to face Brazil in a friendly at the Amsterdam Arena. Van Bronckhorst scored his first goal for Ons Oranje in August 1996 at the FNB Stadium against South Africa. He was part of the Netherlands squad for the 1998 FIFA World Cup, but did not play during the tournament. He only saw limited action in Euro 2000 on home soil, as cover for left-back Arthur Numan.

Euro 2004 and 2006 World Cup

Van Bronckhorst (who was regularly played as a midfielder at club level at the time) was deployed by manager Dick Advocaat as a left-back at Euro 2004. The Netherlands reached the semi-finals of the tournament, only to fall to hosts Portugal.

Van Bronckhorst was a regular in the national team for the 2006 World Cup qualification campaign. In the round of 16 match against Portugal (see Battle of Nuremberg), he received a red card in a match that saw four red cards given, a World Cup record.

 Euro 2008 
Van Bronckhorst scored in a Euro 2008 qualifying match against Slovenia on 28 March 2007. The Netherlands went on to win the match by 1–0.

On 9 June 2008, in a group match against Italy, he cleared the ball off his own line, ran deep into the Italian half, then delivered a cross to Dirk Kuyt. Kuyt then headed down to Wesley Sneijder who slotted the ball past the advancing Gianluigi Buffon. Van Bronckhorst later scored another goal to condemn the then World Cup champions to a 3–0 defeat.

Prior to Euro 2008, captain Edwin van der Sar announced his intention to retire from international football after the tournament; he played his last match as captain in the 3–1 quarter-final loss to Russia. Van Bronckhorst was named Van der Sar's replacement as captain.

 2010 World Cup 
Van Bronckhorst was included in the Netherlands' preliminary squad for the tournament, and on 27 May 2010, Dutch manager Bert van Marwijk announced he would be part of the final squad of 23 and would serve as team captain. In the semi-final against Uruguay, he scored the opening goal of a 3–2 win. The powerful long-range strike – which rose into goalkeeper Fernando Muslera's top left-hand corner – was widely considered one of the best goals in World Cup history.

Van Bronckhorst's final match for the Netherlands and as a professional footballer came in the World Cup final against Spain. He was substituted in the 105th minute for Edson Braafheid with the score 0–0, only for Andrés Iniesta to condemn the Dutch to a defeat, scoring the only goal of the match in the 116th minute. After ending the tournament as runners-up, Van Bronckhorst stated he was proud of what the team had achieved.

 Managerial career 

Feyenoord

Having retired at the end of the 2009–10 season prior to the 2010 World Cup, it was announced on 21 July 2011 that Van Bronckhorst would assist newly appointed Feyenoord manager Ronald Koeman, alongside fellow ex-Feyenoord player Jean-Paul van Gastel. Feyenoord finished the season second behind Ajax, thereby qualifying for the 2012–13 UEFA Champions League. On 23 March 2015, it was announced Van Bronckhorst would be the new manager of Feyenoord after Fred Rutten would leave at the end of that season.

On his managerial debut on 8 August 2015, Van Bronckhorst won 3–2 at home to FC Utrecht, with the winning penalty coming from Dirk Kuyt, who had been brought back after nine years abroad. In his first full season, Van Bronckhorst led Feyenoord to win the 2015–16 KNVB Cup after the club defeated Utrecht 2–1 in the final. In his second season, Van Bronckhorst won the Eredivisie title, Feyenoord's first in 18 years.

In 2017–18, Feyenoord opened the season by winning the 2017 Johan Cruyff Shield on penalties against Vitesse. On 17 December 2017, the team won 7–0 away at Sparta Rotterdam in the Rotterdam derby. The team again won the KNVB Cup, with a 3–0 final victory over AZ Alkmaar on 22 April 2018; it was the tournament's 100th final.

On 24 January 2019, Van Bronckhorst announced that he would be leaving Feyenoord after the 2018–19 season.

Guangzhou R&F

On 4 January 2020, Van Bronckhorst signed with Chinese Super League side Guangzhou R&F. He came 11th in his only season, then quit in December so he could return to his family.

 Rangers 
On 18 November 2021, Van Bronckhorst was appointed manager of Rangers, 20 years after leaving as a player. He replaced Steven Gerrard, who had moved to Aston Villa. On his Rangers managerial debut, he won 2–0 at home to Sparta Prague in the UEFA Europa League group stage; on his Scottish Premiership debut on 28 November, he won 3–1 at Livingston. A run of seven consecutive league wins from his debut ended with a 1–1 draw at Aberdeen on 18 January 2022, and a series of ten unbeaten league games under his management ended on 2 February with a 3–0 loss at Celtic, ceding first place to the rivals.

Van Bronckhorst's Rangers did not recover first place in the league, which went to Celtic under their new manager Ange Postecoglou. On the European front, the team made their first continental final since 2008 with knockout victories over Borussia Dortmund, Red Star Belgrade, Braga and RB Leipzig. They lost the 2022 final to Eintracht Frankfurt on penalties. Days later, Rangers won the Scottish Cup final 2–0 against Hearts for their first such trophy since 2009, having earlier beaten Celtic in the semi-finals.

Rangers qualified for the 2022–23 UEFA Champions League group stage under van Bronckhorst, but then suffered six consecutive defeats in that tournament and fell nine points behind Celtic in the 2022–23 Scottish Premiership. Van Bronckhorst was sacked by Rangers on 21 November, during the World Cup break.

Personal life
Van Bronckhorst and his wife Marieke have two sons. United States international Giovanni Reyna – son of Van Bronckhorst's former Rangers teammate Claudio Reyna – is named after him.

 Career statistics 
 Club 

International

Scores and results list the Netherlands' goal tally first, score column indicates score after each van Bronckhorst goal.

 Managerial statistics 

 Honours 

 Player FeyenoordKNVB Cup: 1994−95, 2007−08RangersScottish Premier League: 1998−99, 1999−2000
Scottish Cup: 1998–99, 1999–2000
Scottish League Cup: 1998–99ArsenalPremier League: 2001−02
FA Cup: 2001–02, 2002–03BarcelonaLa Liga: 2004–05, 2005−06
Supercopa de España: 2005, 2006
UEFA Champions League: 2005−06NetherlandsFIFA World Cup runner-up: 2010

 Manager FeyenoordEredivisie: 2016–17
KNVB Cup: 2015–16, 2017–18
Johan Cruyff Shield: 2017, 2018Rangers''' 
Scottish Cup: 2021–22
UEFA Europa League runner-up: 2021–22

Personal 
Knight of the Order of Orange-Nassau: 2010

See also
 List of footballers with 100 or more caps

References

External links 

  
 
 Voetbal International profile
 
 
 

1975 births
Living people
Dutch people of Indonesian descent
Dutch people of Moluccan descent
Sportspeople of Indonesian descent
Indo people
Footballers from Rotterdam
Dutch footballers
Association football fullbacks
Association football midfielders
Association football utility players
RKC Waalwijk players
Feyenoord players
Rangers F.C. players
Arsenal F.C. players
FC Barcelona players
Eredivisie players
Scottish Premier League players
Premier League players
La Liga players
UEFA Champions League winning players
Netherlands international footballers
1998 FIFA World Cup players
UEFA Euro 2000 players
UEFA Euro 2004 players
2006 FIFA World Cup players
UEFA Euro 2008 players
2010 FIFA World Cup players
FIFA Century Club
Dutch expatriate footballers
Dutch expatriate sportspeople in Scotland
Dutch expatriate sportspeople in England
Dutch expatriate sportspeople in Spain
Expatriate footballers in Scotland
Expatriate footballers in England
Expatriate footballers in Spain
Dutch football managers
Feyenoord managers
Guangzhou City F.C. managers
Rangers F.C. managers
Eredivisie managers
Chinese Super League managers
Scottish Professional Football League managers
Dutch expatriate football managers
Dutch expatriate sportspeople in China
Expatriate football managers in China
Expatriate football managers in Scotland
Knights of the Order of Orange-Nassau